Lowton railway station served the village named Town of Lowton to the east of Newton-le-Willows and south of Golborne.

Location
It stood immediately east of a crossroads known locally as "Newton Four Lane Ends", to the north was Golborne Dale Road and south was Parkside Lane (later Warrington Road, then Parkside Road), this north–south road became the A573. To the east was Newton Road and west was Southworth Road, the A572.

The station
The station was a single storey wooden building on the east side of the line where the two lines diverged south of Southworth Road, the southbound platform was of low construction and ran from the station building back towards Southworth Road overbridge, this platform then ran under the road bridge and northwards at a more normal height. The northbound platform was opposite the higher section of southbound platform all to the north of Southworth Road and had a shelter. The station building and southbound platform was accessed by steps down from the road overbridge. The northbound platform was accessed by a ramped road from Southworth Road. Lowton signal box was opposite the station building was an unusually high structure necessary to see the lines to the north over the road overbridge. Carriage sidings were located to the south of the station alongside the east curve but there were no goods facilities at the station.

The line and services

Prior to the station opening 
The Wigan Branch Railway (WBR) opened a line on 3 September 1832 from Wigan to connect with the Liverpool and Manchester Railway (L&MR) with an east curve (that is towards Manchester) near Parkside.

In 1834 the WBR became part of the North Union Railway (NUR). From 1 January 1846 the NUR was leased jointly by the Grand Junction Railway (GJR) and the Manchester and Leeds Railway (M&LR). Later in 1846 the leases passed, by amalgamation from the GJR to the London and North Western Railway (L&NWR) and from the M&LR to the Lancashire and Yorkshire Railway.

Early L&NWR 1847 - 1864 
On 1 January 1847 the L&NWR opened a west curve onto the L&MR and Lowton station was opened at the juncture of the two curves, probably at the same time or shortly afterwards. In its early days it was known as Preston Junction in the timetables between Liverpool and Manchester and North Union Junction in the north/southbound timetables, Bradshaw (1847) notes the latter timetable as the Preston & Parkside section of the L&NWR. By 1850 this practice appears to have ceased, both tables in Bradshaw showing the station name as Preston Junction.

This was the stations busiest period. Timetables showed the services to Preston Junction among the Liverpool to and from Manchester services with a note "By the trains marked N.U. being especially North Union Trains, the passengers for Manchester or Liverpool will be detained unavoidably at Preston Junction until the arrival of the trains from Preston". The north–south services were usually shown in a different table, for example in Bradshaw (1847) the Preston & Parkside section shows the same services departing Manchester and Liverpool going via North Union Junction to Wigan and Preston. These trains comprised through northbound carriages from both Manchester and Liverpool which met the southbound service from Preston at the station, the trains were re-organised before proceeding onwards in three different directions (towards Preston, Manchester and Liverpool), quite how this was achieved at the simple diverging double track at the junction is not known.
The following table shows the passenger trains through the station on a weekday in 1847, on Sundays there were two trains in each direction to Liverpool and Manchester and only the mail trains to and from the south, details have been extracted from Bradshaw. There will have been a considerable amount of freight traffic using the same lines.

By 1850 the five NUR trains had been reduced to four.

Later L&NWR 1864 - 1922/1923 
The station lost some traffic and importance in 1864 when the Winwick cut-off route between Winwick to the south and Golborne to the north, the cut-off became the main west-coast route.

The station was renamed to Lowton and Preston Junction on 1 February 1877 and finally Lowton in 1880.

Lowton was closed from 1 January 1917 to 1 February 1919 probably as a wartime economy measure.

In 1922 twelve services called at Lowton in each direction on Mondays to Saturdays, most were local services. Southbound they mostly started from Wigan with only two early services starting elsewhere, first train, the 0633, began at Preston and the following train, the 0714, from Golborne. There was no Sunday service.

Post L&NWR to station closure 

The station closed on 26 September 1949.

The line after the station closed 
Local passenger traffic ceased between Crewe and Preston via Earlestown on 6 October 1969.

The lines from  through the west facing Parkside junction and Lowton junction formed a secondary West Coast Main Line (WCML) route that was electrified as part of the WCML modernisation which was completed in 1974. Electrification needed Southworth Road overbridge to be rebuilt to provide the necessary clearance.

The lines through the station site are still open in 2020.

References

Notes

Citations

Sources

Further reading

External links

 
 
 

Former North Union Railway stations
Railway stations in Great Britain opened in 1847
Railway stations in Great Britain closed in 1917
Railway stations in Great Britain opened in 1919
Railway stations in Great Britain closed in 1949
Disused railway stations in the Metropolitan Borough of Wigan
1847 establishments in England